Raymond Henry Bonham Carter (19 June 1929 – 17 January 2004) was a British banker and a member of the prominent Bonham Carter family.

Early life
He was born in Paddington, London, to Sir Maurice Bonham-Carter (1880–1960), a politician and cricketer, and his wife, Lady Violet Asquith (1887–1969), a political activist who was created Baroness Asquith of Yarnbury in 1964. Her father was H. H. Asquith (1852–1928), who served as Prime Minister from 1908 to 1916 and became the 1st Earl of Oxford and Asquith in 1925.

His elder siblings were Cressida Ridley, Laura Grimond and Mark Bonham Carter, Baron Bonham-Carter. He was educated at St. Ronan's School, Hawkhurst, Winchester College and Magdalen College, Oxford, graduating in 1952. He then went to Harvard.

Career
At various times, he held senior posts with the Bank of England (1958–1963), the International Monetary Fund (1961–1963), Warburgs (1963–1977), and the Department of Industry (1977–1979).

Marriage and children
In 1958, he married Elena Propper de Callejón, daughter of Spanish diplomat Eduardo Propper de Callejón (1895–1972) and his Franco-Austrian Jewish wife, Hélène Fould-Springer. Together, they had three children:
Edward Bonham Carter (born 24 May 1960), Vice Chairman of fund management group Jupiter Fund Management.
Helena Bonham Carter (born 26 May 1966), a twice Academy Award-nominated actress.
Thomas Bonham Carter, who manages a corporate governance agency.

In 1979, he was diagnosed with a brain tumour, which was removed by surgery, but left him quadriplegic and partially blind.

References

Further reading
Jenni Frazer. "How Helena’s grandfather was finally recognised as a true hero" The Jewish Chronicle 8 February 2008, narrating how Eduardo Propper de Callejón was recognized as "Righteous Among Nations". Retrieved 28 February 2008. NB: Back issues of the Chronicle require a subscription or a per-day payment for access.

1929 births
2004 deaths
Alumni of Magdalen College, Oxford
Asquith family
Raymond
British bankers
Fould family
Harvard University alumni
People educated at Winchester College
People with tetraplegia
Sons of life peers